The Cape Cod (Registration: NR761W) was a single engine six-seat utility aircraft that was flown by Russell Boardman and John Polando from New York City to Istanbul in 1931.

History

Early history
The plane was purchased as a Bellanca CH-300, and was originally named The American Legion. Following a fire which destroyed the aircraft in October 1930, the aircraft was sent back to Bellanca for a repair cost of $ (equivalent to $ in today's dollars). After it was repaired, it was renamed Cape Cod, after the peninsula in Massachusetts where John Polando and Russell Boardman trained for their overseas flight. The plane was then reclassified as a Bellanca Special J-300.

Record attempt
The record attempt took place between July 28 and 30, 1931. John Polando and Russell Boardman took off from Floyd Bennett Field, flying over Newfoundland and dropping The New York Times at lighthouses in the province. Along the way, they also flew over Ireland, Paris, and Munich. They also circled the Swiss Alps at night to avoid crashing into them. While it was originally planned for them to fly to Moscow, it was determined that Istanbul would be easier, because it would allow for them to still break the record.

The plane itself was shipped back on the SS Exochorda.

Later history and conservation
The aircraft was later sold to people from Cleveland, Ohio. With the addition of a new motor, and renamed The Clevelander, the plane eventually crashed into the side of a mountain in Mexico, in 1948. Before its record-setting flight, photos of the Cape Cod were taken by Boston Herald photographer Leslie Jones as part of his work for the newspaper, and are preserved in the collection of the Boston Public Library.

Specifications (Bellanca CH-300)

References

Individual aircraft
1930s United States special-purpose aircraft
High-wing aircraft
Transatlantic flight
Single-engined tractor aircraft